Ted Bates  is the general name for the advertising agency founded by Ted Bates in 1940. The company grew to become the world’s fourth largest agency.

History
The firm was founded by Ted Bates in 1940 as Ted Bates, Inc.. It was purchased by Saatchi & Saatchi in 1986, and merged in 1987 with Backer & Spielvogel Advertising to form Backer Spielvogel Bates Worldwide, Inc.. 

In 1994 the name was changed back to Bates Worldwide. Meanwhile, the parent company Saatchi & Saatchi changed its name to Cordiant plc in 1995. In 1997 Cordiant spun off both Saatchi & Saatchi and Bates Worldwide, and Bates became the primary subsidiary firm of a newly formed holding company, Cordiant Communications Group. 

In 2003, Cordiant was purchased by WPP Group.

Accomplishments
Ted Bates' creative partner was advertising maverick Rosser Reeves, who invented the TV commercial, crafted one of the most popular brand slogans of all time (M&M's "melt in your mouth, not in your hand"), wrote the first bestselling book on advertising, "Reality in Advertising," and created the famous unique selling proposition (or USP) that is still used by marketers today.

To quote David Ogilvy, founder of Ogilvy & Mather, "Rosser taught me my trade….and that the real purpose of advertising was to sell the product". Their edict of effectiveness remains a core focus for the agency today. Ted and Rosser are in many ways the original "ad men," it is widely accepted that the popular TV drama Mad Men is based, at least in part on them.

Work for Tobacco Industry
A one-page, 1967 Tobacco Institute document is the text of a proposed print ad designed to confuse the public about the link between smoking and lung cancer.  It was one of five ads drafted and tested by Ted Bates & Company, Inc. Advertising for the Tobacco Institute in the wake of the publication of the 1967 Surgeon General's Report, The Health Consequences of Smoking.

A partial quote from the document:

"COMMUNISM CAUSES CANCER

You don't believe it?  Well, wait a second.  Let's use the same kind of statistical analysis the Public Health Service is using to 'prove' that cigarettes cause cancer.  We'll use only statistical facts taken from bona fide population surveys.

Americans smoke a lot and some of them die of lung cancer.  The Dutch smoke less than Americans, but more of them die of lung cancer.
The Australians smoke a lot and some of them die of lung cancer.  The British smoke as much as the Australians, but twice as many British have lung cancer...

One statistical inference is very clear.  In each pair of countries, the higher cancer rate is in the country closer to the Iron Curtain...By the same means that some public servants are using to indict cigarettes, we've just proved that Communism causes cancer.  But you know and we know, Communism is not guilty.  And nobody yet knows about cigarettes."

References

External links
Reputation Management
Reputation Defenders Site

WPP plc
1986 mergers and acquisitions
1997 mergers and acquisitions
2003 mergers and acquisitions
Mass media companies established in 1940
1940 establishments in the United States
Advertising agencies of the United States